'Twas the Night Before Christmas is an alternative title of the poem A Visit from St. Nicholas by Clement Clarke Moore.

Twas the Night Before Christmas may also refer to:

 Twas the Night Before Christmas (1974 TV special), a Rankin-Bass animated Christmas special
 Twas the Night Before Christmas (1977 TV special), a Christmas special starring Paul Lynde
 Twas the Night Before Christmas (smoke-free version), a 2012 children's book adaptation of Moore's poem with references to smoking removed
 Twas the Night Before Christmas", an early-1940s song by Ken Darby and the King's Men

See also
 'Twas the Night Before Christmas...Again", an episode of the television series Tru Calling
 'Twas the Night, a 2001 Disney Channel movie
 Christmas Eve (disambiguation)
 The Night Before Christmas (disambiguation)
 The Nightmare Before Christmas (disambiguation)